An equivalent territory, formally known as territory equivalent to a regional county municipality, is a territorial unit used by Statistics Canada and the Institut de la statistique du Québec.

Quebec is divided into 87 regional county municipalities (RCMs), equivalent to counties in other jurisdictions.  However, the RCMs do not cover the entire territory, since major cities are outside any RCM. To ensure complete territorial coverage for certain purposes, such as the census, the equivalent territories are defined.

Most equivalent territories correspond to certain urban agglomerations; the others are Jamésie, Eeyou Istchee, and Kativik, which comprise the Nord-du-Québec region.

Equivalent territories by region

See also
 List of regional county municipalities and equivalent territories in Quebec

External links
 

Local government in Quebec